The 1984 Grand Prix d'Automne was the 78th edition of the Paris–Tours cycle race and was held on 7 October 1984. The race started in Blois and finished in Chaville. The race was won by Sean Kelly.

General classification

References

1984 in French sport
1984
1984 Super Prestige Pernod